= Internal Medicine (Japanese Society of Internal Medicine journal) =

- Discipline: Internal medicine
- Language: English
- Edited by: Masahiro Asaka

Publication details
- Former name: Japanese Journal of Medicine
- History: 1961-present
- Publisher: Japanese Society of Internal Medicine (Japan)
- Frequency: Monthly
- Open access: Yes
- Impact factor: 1.037 (2010)

Standard abbreviations
- ISO 4: Intern. Med.

Indexing
- CODEN: IEDIEP
- ISSN: 0918-2918 (print); 1349-7235 (web)
- OCLC no.: 61232412

Links
- Journal homepage; online access; Online archive; Online archive of the Japanese Journal of Medicine

Internal Medicine is a peer-reviewed open-access medical journal published monthly by the Japanese Society of Internal Medicine. It was established in 1961 as the Japanese Journal of Medicine and obtained its current title in 1992.

== Abstracting and indexing ==
The journal is abstracted and indexed in Current Contents, EMBASE, MEDLINE, Science Citation Index, and Scopus.
